Voskos is an American brand of strained yogurt produced by Sun Valley Dairy in Sun Valley, California. The word voskós (or βοσκός in Greek) means "shepherd".

History
Voskos is a privately owned company that launched in 2009. In August 2013, Voskos participated in the "Student Strong: A Feed The Children Rebuilding Event" in Moore, Oklahoma. The company donated 9,000 cups of yogurt to kids and families that were devastated by a series of tornados that hit the area earlier that year.
In September 2013 Voskos expanded its distribution in the Northeast to retailers such as, Stop & Shop, Giant Food Stores, Martin's Food Markets and Peapod.
In January 2014, the brand launched its first national TV ad campaign with a new television commercial.

References

External links

Companies based in California
American brands
Brand name yogurts
Yogurt companies